Ambucetamide is an antispasmodic found to be particularly effective for the relief of menstrual pain.  It was discovered in 1953 by Paul Janssen.

References

 
 

Antispasmodics
Acetamides
Phenol ethers
Janssen Pharmaceutica
Belgian inventions